Act of God is a studio album by the American Thrash/speed metal band Znowhite.

Track listing 
All songs by Ian Tafoya

 "To the Last Breath"  - 5:38
 "Baptized by Fire"  - 3:58
 "Pure Blood"  - 4:52
 War Machine  - 5:26
 "Thunderdome"  - 4:34
 "Rest in Peace"  - 6:03
 "Diseased Bigotry"  - 4:48
 "A Soldier's Creed"  - 4:12
 "Something Wicked (This Way Comes)"  - 9:26

Personnel
 Nicole Lee - Vocals
 Ian Tafoya - Guitars
 Scott Schafer - Bass and Drums

References

1988 albums
Znowhite albums
Roadrunner Records albums